Mašovice is a small village and a part of the municipality of Meclov in the Domažlice District in the Plzeň Region, the Czech Republic. It is located about 1.5 km northeast of Meclov. There are 26 addresses recorded here. The village had a population of 67 in 2011.

Description 

Mašovice is a village located southwest of Horšovský Týn on the Černý Stream. The larger part of the village is located on the right bank of the stream, and the smaller part is on the left near the Mašovice train station. The Mašovice cadastre also includes the camp, which is located under the dam of the Podhájí pond. It consists of several buildings including a pub. South of the larger part of Mašovice is the building of the agricultural cooperative.

Mašovice is connected in two places on road number I/26. And also connected by two roads to the village of Meclov. On the bank of Černý Stream, there is a village square for the most part, which is surrounded by houses.

History 

The first written mention of the village dates back to 1115, when it had to belong to Kladruby monastery. In 19th century, there was a watermill located on the western part of the village. In the years 1869–1960 it was an independent municipality. Mašovice has been part of the municipality of Meclov since 1961.

Landmarks 

To the west of the village, the remains of a hill fort from the Bronze Age can be found on Mlýnský vrch (Mill Hill).

References

External links 
 

Villages in Domažlice District